Penguin European Writers is a series of books published by Penguin Books in the UK. The series began in 2018, and contains forgotten classics by European writers with introductions by acclaimed contemporary authors.

Books

See also 

 Penguin Essentials
 Green Ideas

References 

Lists of novels
Penguin Books book series